Acalolepta grossescapa is a species of beetle in the family Cerambycidae. It was described by Stephan von Breuning in 1942. It is endemic to Taiwan.

References

Acalolepta
Beetles of Asia
Insects of Taiwan
Endemic fauna of Taiwan
Beetles described in 1942
Taxa named by Stephan von Breuning (entomologist)